The Bega Budget was a biweekly newspaper published in Bega, New South Wales, Australia from 1905 until 1923.

History
The Bega Budget was first published on 30 September 1905 by William Boot.  Boot ran the paper until 1923 when it was sold to the proprietors of the other newspapers in Bega. The Bega Budget was then merged with Southern Star and Bega Standard to produce the Bega District News.

Digitisation
The paper has been digitised as part of the Australian Newspapers Digitisation Program project of the National Library of Australia.

See also
 List of newspapers in Australia
 List of newspapers in New South Wales

References

External links
 

Defunct newspapers published in New South Wales
Newspapers on Trove
Newspapers established in 1905
1905 establishments in Australia
Publications disestablished in 1923
1923 disestablishments in Australia